Ravenna is the first studio album by Canadian rock band The Reason and was released on September 13, 2004. It was recorded in Burlington, Ontario at The Music Gym. Ravenna was produced by Luke Marshall and The Reason, and the only album to feature bassist Sean Palmer and Erik Mikalauskas on guitar and vocals.

Track listing 

"Reclaiming The Throne"
"The Joke and the Gentleman"
"A Timeless Classic"
"Papercuts and Exit Wounds"
"150"
"My Prescription"
"Subways In Pittsburgh"
"Red Sky At Dawn"
"Afterparty At the Actor's Estate"
"Tortoise"

Personnel 

Adam White - Vocals 
James Nelan - Guitar
Erik Mikalauskas - Guitar
Sean Palmer - Bass
Cam Bordignon - Drums
Luke Marshall - Producer
Mike Borkosky - Mixing

The Reason (band) albums
2005 albums